The Thai Ridgeback is a dog from Thailand. The Thai Ridgeback is one of only three breeds that has a ridge of hair that runs along its back in the opposite direction to the rest of the coat. The other two are the Rhodesian Ridgeback and the Phu Quoc Ridgeback.

Appearance

The Thai Ridgeback is a muscular, medium-sized pariah-type dog with a wedge-shaped head, triangular-shaped prick ears, and a very short, smooth coat. It has a pronounced ridge on its back formed by hair growing in the opposite direction that extends from behind the withers to the hips. Puppies are occasionally born ridgeless. Thai Ridgebacks have a muscular and streamlined body, making them extremely agile. The tail is carried upward called a sickle or sword tail. Its forehead wrinkles with enormous expression.  Like many eastern breeds,  the Thai Ridgeback has retained a  'scissor jaw' where upper and lower teeth interlock when the jaw bones clamp down.  The tongue can be black or have black marks.  Eyes are almond-shaped and brown but may be amber in blue dogs. The ears are set low and point slightly outward. The ears stand up progressively during the puppy growth period; they are not cropped. The back is straight and level. The coat is short, hard, and straight. Due to the length and density of the coat shedding is minimal, occurring once or twice yearly. Because this breed does not have an undercoat the hair does not usually bother people allergic to other breeds of dogs. Coat must be solid colors of blue, black, red or fawn with a black mask being acceptable on reds. However, brindle and white are also found but are not acceptable colors. For international show and competition, shoulder height should be 22–24 inches (56–61 cm) in males and 20–22 inches (51–56 cm) in females. The weight averages 35–55 lbs (16–25 kg) in females and 51–74 lbs (23–34 kg) in males.

Eight distinctive ridge patterns have been identified: needle, feather, arrow, lute, violin, bowling pin, leaf, and saddleback. All patterns are acceptable, but must be clearly defined and symmetrical. The broader the ridge, the more highly it is prized.

Health
Thai ridgebacks are a hearty, overall healthy breed with few inherent health issues. The breed has reproduced in Thailand almost exclusively by natural selection until the very recent past. The domesticated population is small. Inbreeding depression has not been observed in the breed. Thai Ridgeback Dogs are prone to dermoid sinus. Modern lines of Thai Ridgeback, resulting from interpopulation crosses, may also be prone to hip dysplasia and other genetic disorders.

Temperament
Thai Ridgebacks are an intelligent breed. The energy level is typically medium to high, with most of the day spent lounging and activity periods occurring in sporadic bursts. Well bred and properly socialized Thai Ridgebacks make loyal, loving family pets. They are naturally protective of their home and family and can be aggressive or shy when not properly socialized. They are best kept by consistent owners who have a thorough understanding of dog behavior. Because of prior geographic isolation and lack of human contact, the Thai Ridgeback remains independent minded and much of the original natural instinct and drives remain intact, particularly prey drive. Due to its nature, the Thai Ridgeback is not recommended for the novice dog handler. They have an excellent jumping ability and may seek to roam if not properly contained.

Genetics

Ridge 
 

The ridgeback is under a control of two groups of epistatic genes. The first determines the existence of the ridge. The other determines the size of the ridge, from none to very large (down to the side) the latter, the more the genes in the dog, the broader is the ridge. The ridge will appear only if there is at least one dominant allele in both groups.

Color 
Coat color is also under a control of two groups of epistatic genes. The first determines the color of the coat if it should be black, brown, red or blue. The series of dominance is black to brindle to red to white. The intensity of the coat color is under control of a set of modifying genes. The other group controls the dilution of the colors. Black can be dilute to gray/silver/blue, and red will turn fawn. The normal color is dominance over the diluted.

History
The other existing breeds of ridgeback dog are the Rhodesian Ridgeback from Africa and the Phu Quoc Ridgeback from Vietnam, which is somewhat smaller than the Thai Ridgeback. 

The Rhodesian Ridgeback is partly descended from the southern African indigenous Hottentot Khoi dog, a known ridge-bearing dog. The gene that causes the ridge has been inherited from a common ancestor: "The geographical origin of the ridge present in Ridgeback dogs is still a mystery, thus solid proof has now been provided that the ridge mutation in Ridgeback dogs is identical by descent and the likelihood of parallel mutations occurring in Asia and Africa (Epstein, 1937) can therefore be rejected."

Grooming 
The Thai Ridgeback has a short coat that is easily cared for with a weekly brushing. Use a rubber curry brush to keep it gleaming. It sheds year-round, but not heavily. Give it a bath when it is dirty, maybe once or twice a year. Introduce your puppy to grooming from an early age so that it learns to accept it with little fuss.

See also
 Dogs portal
 List of dog breeds
Phu Quoc Ridgeback
Rhodesian Ridgeback

References

External links

FCI breeds
Dog breeds originating in Thailand
Dog landraces
Rare dog breeds
Ridgeback dogs
Sighthounds